ACOMA (Ateliers de Construction de Matériaux) are a French microcar maker that operated between 1972 and 1984. The cars were designed by Émile Boussereau from Villeneuve-la-Comtesse and produced in Laval from 1970 to 1972 when manufacturing moved to Saint-Barthélemy-d'Anjou, near Angers until production stopped in 1984.

History
Boussereau was the local mechanic at Villeneuve-la-Comtesse and had been asked in 1970 by a young disabled person to make a car to get around town. He created the Comtesse. Acoma became aware of the vehicle and began manufacturing them from 1972 until 1979 as the Mini-Comtesse.

Models
The Acoma microcars were classified as an “L-Category” car in France. These were able to be driven without a driver's license. ACOMA were the largest manufacturer of this category of cars taking about 30% of the market share. The company made six different models during its existence.

Mini-Comtesse

The Mini-Comtesse was the smallest car produced. It was a single seater three wheeler with two training wheels at the front to improve stability. To comply with "L category" regulations the car had a pedal to propel the vehicle. Pushing down on the pedal would propel the car about one foot forward. The car had a conventional door on one side and folding gull wing door on the other to allow it to park in extremely confined spaces. The car was front-engine, front-wheel drive by a Sachs air-cooled 49cc single cylinder, 2-stroke, 3 bhp engine connected by a centrifugal clutch to a two speed gearbox with no reverse gear. It had a top speed of 20 mph. Production of the Mini-Comtesse ended in 1979. Paul Clement-Colin says they were powered by a Saxonette 47cc or Motobécane 50cc engine.

Super Comtesse
The 4 wheel Super Comtesse began production in 1978 and was powered by a Motobécane engine.

Comtesse Berline
The Comtesse Berline replaced the Super Comtesse in 1980.

Mini-Comtesse: Sport, Coupé, and Station wagon
Three further models were produced in 1980 in conjunction with the Berline, the sport which was a targa top design, the coupe, and the wagon.

Starlette
The Starlette, a larger version of the coupe was released in 1982 with a 49cc engine.

Star
With the same body as the Starlette in 1982 but with a 125cc engine.

In culture
The French film director Pascal Rabaté occasionally used the Mini Countess in his feature films of 2010 (Les Petits Ruisseaux) and 2011 (Ni à vendre ni à louer). They were respectively shot in the departments of Maine-et-Loire and Loire-Atlantique.

References

Defunct motor vehicle manufacturers of France